Alexander Campbell (1764–1824) was a Scottish musician and miscellaneous writer.

Early life and education 
Campbell was born in 1764 at Tombea, Loch Lubnaig, and first educated at the grammar school, Callander, was the second son of a carpenter who, falling into straitened circumstances, removed to Edinburgh, where he died when Alexander was eleven years old. The family was supported by John, the eldest son, afterwards a well-known Edinburgh character (John Campbell died 1795, was precentor at the Canongate church, and a friend of Burns; his picture appears thrice in Kay's 'Portraits'). The two brothers were pupils of Tenducci, then a music teacher in Edinburgh, who helped to establish them both in his own profession. Campbell was appointed organist to an 'episcopalian chapel in the neighbourhood of Nicholson Street.' He also gave lessons in singing. Among his pupils were the Scotts. But the lads had no taste for the subject; the master had no patience. The result was that 'our neighbour, Lady Cunningham, sent to beg the boys might not all be flogged precisely at the same hour, as, though she had no doubt the punishment was deserved, the noise of the concord was really dreadful' (Notes to Scott's Autobiography, in chap. i. of LOCKHART'S Life). While a teacher he published 'Twelve Songs set to Music' (1785?) About the time he became engaged in quarrel with Kay, whom he ridiculed in a sketch. This procured him a place in Kay's 'Portraits,' where he is represented turning a hand organ while asses bray, a dog howls, a bagpipe is blown, and a saw sharpened as an accompaniment (vol. ii. print 204).

Adult life 
Campbell married twice at a comparatively early age. His second wife was the widow of Ranald Macdonald of Keppoch. Thinking that the connection thus formed might be useful in procuring an appointment, he resigned his music teaching and studied medicine at the university of Edinburgh. Though in 1798 he announced 'A Free and Impartial Inquiry into the Present State of Medical Knowledge' (a work apparently never published), he does not seem to have practised his new profession, but to have devoted himself to literary work. 

At this period he wrote 'Odes and Miscellaneous Poems, by a student of medicine at the university of Edinburgh' (Edinburgh, 1796), and also published some drawings of highland scenery made on the spot.

Campbell's next work was 'An Introduction to the History of Poetry in Scotland' (Edinburgh, 1798). This contains a collection of Scotch songs; it was illustrated by David Allen, and dedicated to H. Fuseli. It is written in a curiously stilted style but contains much information about contemporary poets and poetasters. Though only ninety copies were printed, it excited some notice. L. T. Rosegarten supplements his translation (Lübeck and Leipzig, 1802) of T. Garnett's 'Tour in the Highlands,' 1800, with information drawn from it. Rosegarten specially commends the views therein expressed about Ossian, the authenticity of whose poem Campbell stoutly maintained. 

Campbell now produced 'A Journey from Edinburgh through parts of North Britain [1802, new edition 1811], with drawings made on the spot' by the writer. This is an interesting and even valuable picture of the state of many parts of the country at the beginning of the century. Francis Jukes worked throughout 1802 on publishing for him "A Journey from Edinburgh to Parts of North Britain" aka "A Journey to Scotland".

It was followed by 'The Grampians Desolate, a poem in six books' (Edinburgh, 1804). 

More than half of this work, which is without literary merit, consists of notes. Its object was to call attention to the 'deplorable condition' of the highlands, brought about by the introduction of sheep-farming. A melancholy incident recorded in a note to page 11 led to the establishment of the Edinburgh Destitute Sick Society. 

After some interval there appeared 'Albyn's Anthology, or a select collection of the melodies and vocal poetry of Scotland, peculiar to Scotland and the Isles, hitherto unpublished' (2 vols. Edinburgh, 1816 and 1818). 

Campbell had projected this work since 1790, but it was not till Henry Mackenzie, Walter Scott (who obtained the prince regent's acceptance of the dedication of the book), and other Edinburgh men of note, gave him their help that the project was carried out. A grant was obtained from the Highland Society, and the author travelled between eleven and twelve hundred miles in collecting materials (preface). Among the contributors of verse are Scott, Hogg, Jamieson, and Alexander Boswell. In the 'Anthology' (p. 66) Campbell claims the authorship of the well-known air usually joined to Tannahill's 'Gloomy Winter's nou awa';’ but the claim has been disputed (ANDERSON, Scottish Nation).

Later life 
In the last years of his life Campbell fell into great poverty, and obtained his living chiefly by copying manuscripts for his old pupil Scott, though 'even from his patron he would take no more than he thought his services as a transcriber fairly earned.' Scott, however, tells a half-pitiful story of a dinner which Archibald Constable gave to 'his own circle of literary serfs,' when 'poor Allister Campbell and another drudge of the same class' ran a race for a new pair of breeches, which were there displayed 'before the threadbare rivals.' Scott thought the picture might be highly coloured, and at any rate Constable bestowed on him 'many substantial benefits,' as he gratefully acknowledges in a letter written the year before his death, which took place from an attack of apoplexy 15 May 1824. His manuscripts were sold 'under judicial authority.' Among them was a tragedy, which was never published. Campbell was a warm-hearted and accomplished, though somewhat unpractical, man. Scott, who wrote an obituary notice of him in the 'Edinburgh Weekly Journal,' says that, though his acquirements were considerable, 'they did not reach that point of perfection which the public demand of those who expect to derive bread from the practice of the fine arts.' [310]

References

1764 births
1824 deaths
18th-century Scottish people
19th-century Scottish people
18th-century Scottish writers
19th-century Scottish writers
18th-century Scottish musicians
19th-century Scottish musicians
Burials at the Canongate Kirkyard
Scottish Jacobites
Alumni of the University of Edinburgh